Renee Cox (born October 16, 1960) is a Jamaican-American artist, photographer, lecturer, political activist and curator. Her work is considered part of the feminist art movement in the United States. Among the best known of her provocative works are Queen Nanny of the Maroons, Raje and Yo Mama's Last Supper, which exemplify her Black Feminist politics. In addition, her work has provoked conversations at the intersections of cultural work, activism, gender, and African Studies. As a specialist in film and digital portraiture, Cox uses light, form, digital technology, and her own signature style to capture the identities and beauty within her subjects and herself.

Background 
Cox has "dedicated her career to deconstructing stereotypes and to reconfiguring the black woman's body, using her nude form as a subject." She uses herself as a primary model in order to promote an idea of "self-love" as articulated by bell hooks in her book Sisters of the Yam, because as Cox writes in an artist's statement, "slavery stripped black men and women of their dignity and identity and that history continues to have an adverse affect [sic] on the African American psyche." One of Cox's main motivations has always been to create new, positive visual representations of African Americans. In her article, "A Gynocentric Aesthetic", Cox argues that a shift to matriarchal art will transform aesthetic expressions to interact with daily life and society, rather than compartmentalized artistic discussions that emphasize beauty over process and expression.

Greg Tate, writer for The Village Voice, wrote: "(Renee's) her own heroine. She's very much about using the work as a platform for self-love. And she's clearly having fun in her role playing. It's a very New York attitude: 'Yeah, so what? I'm Jesus. I'm Wonder Woman."

In addition to making art, Cox has curated and acted. She has done projects for Rush Art Gallery from its inception. In 1996 she curated an exhibition entitled No Doubt at the Aldrich Museum of Art in Ridgefield, Connecticut and she co-starred in Bridgett Davis' independent film Naked Acts, where she portrayed a photographer.

Career

Editorial career 
As a student at Syracuse University, Cox majored in film studies. After graduating, she decided to devote her energy to the realm of still photography. She began as an assistant fashion editor at Glamour Magazine and then moved to Paris to pursue a career as a fashion photographer. She spent three years working in Paris, shooting for magazines including Votre Beaute and Vogue Homme and for designers Issey Miyake and Claude Montana, among others.

Cox then returned to New York City, where she continued to work as a fashion photographer for ten years. Among her clients were editorial magazines such as Essence, Cosmopolitan, Mademoiselle, and Seventeen. She also worked with Spike Lee, producing the poster for his 1988 film School Daze.

In the early 1990s, inspired by the birth of her first son, Cox decided to focus primarily on fine art photography. She received her Master of Fine Arts at the School of Visual Arts in New York and subsequently spent a year working with Mary Kelly and Ron Clark in the Whitney Independent Study Program.

Fine arts career 
In 1994, Cox exhibited her piece It Shall Be Named in the show Black Male: Representations of Masculinity in Contemporary American Art, curated by Thelma Golden at the Whitney Museum of American Art in New York City. A review of the show published in Art in America described the work as referring "back to traditional art forms—in this case, the shaped crucifixes of 13th and 14th century Italy—with deep solemnity. The modern "distortions" and elisions of Cox's representation interact with the reference to iconic martyrdom to evoke the terrible history of lynchings, beatings and emasculation visited on the bodies of black men in this country."

That same year, Cox's seven-foot nude self-portrait Yo Mama was included in the Bad Girls show curated by Marcia Tucker at the New Museum. Cox was the first woman ever to be pregnant during the Whitney Independent Study Program, pregnant at the time with her second son, which motivated her to create the Yo Mama character and series of photographs. In the photograph Cox stands nude, wearing black high heels, brandishing her older son as if he were a weapon. In Yo Mama and the Statue, Cox critiques race and gender issues, whilst attempting to "reconcile her persona as a pregnant black woman artist with the white male convention of museum study and classical statuary."

In 1995, Cox, Fo Wilson, and Tony Cokes created the Negro Art Collective (NAC) to fight cultural misrepresentations about Black Americans. The collective, working with Creative Time and Gee Street Records, created a poster campaign to challenge and provoke preconceived notions about race, crime and poverty. "As far as representation, we have to take it back," Cox explained to the Daily News. The NAC appropriated a quote from scholar Charles Murray and added their commentary so as to appropriate the quote for their purposes. The idea was to present viewers with real information, which flies in the face of what Americans are taught to believe. The 24 by 36 inch posters read: "Surprise, Surprise, 'in raw numbers, European-American whites are the ethnic group with the most people in poverty, most illegitimate children, most people on welfare, most unemployed men, and most arrests for serious crimes.' Surprised."  The posters ran in Manhattan, Brooklyn and Los Angeles. The project was originally inspired by Cox's five-year-old son who had asked her one day: "Why are all black people bad?"

Soon after, Cox created her Raje alter-ego, a superhero who fights racism and teaches children African-American history. In 1998 the body of work was featured in a Fin de Siècle art festival in Nantes, France. Nantes was historically the last stop on the slave trade, before the ships were to return to Africa to pick up their human cargo. The photographs were installed on billboards all over the city.

In 1999, Cox's work was shown in the Venice Biennale, in the Oratorio di S. Ludovico, a 17th-century Catholic church, where her piece Yo Mama's Last Supper a contemporary re-imagining of Leonardo da Vinci's classic, was first shown. In Cox's reimagining of this historically iconic scene, she stood nude in the place of Jesus Christ and is surrounded by all black apostles, except for Judas, who is white. In 2001, the piece was included in a Brooklyn Museum of Art exhibition Committed to the Image: Contemporary Black Photographers, curated by Barbara Millstein.

In 2001, Cox opened a show at the Robert Miller Gallery called American Family. The series featured family snapshots, as well as older family photographs juxtaposed with erotic self-portraits, and new re-creations of art historical classics. "Olympia's Boyz" is featured in this show, which first appeared at the Brooklyn Museum in 2001. Cox has written: "The body of work was a rebellion against all of the pre-ordained roles I am supposed to embrace as a woman: dutiful daughter, diminutive wife, and doting mother."

Later that year Cox undertook another series of photographs, this one named for the Jamaican national heroine, Queen Nanny of the Maroons. In the series, Cox took on the persona of Queen Nanny, who led the Maroons to victory in the First Maroon War. Queen Nanny of the Maroons was originally shown at the Robert Miller Gallery in 2005. Cox then exhibited the body of work in the Jamaican Biennial in 2007 where it won the Aaron Matalon Award.

Cox continues to show her work as well as develop new projects as she is inspired. Her present work explores sacred geometry and the use of fractals to create sculptural kaleidoscopes. Soul Culture for Cox has marked her embrace of the digital world and her continued exploration of the human body as a site to engage viewers and evoke the practice of healthy and intersectional discourse.

Critical assessment 
Writing for Vogue magazine, art critic Roberta Smith described Yo Mama as "one of the most striking images in the East Coast portion of the Bad Girls exhibition…A towering self-portrait, it showed the artist, naked except for a pair of black high heels, holding her two-year-old son…The image presents a woman, both regal and erotic, who seems singularly disinclined to take guff from anyone and whose son will undoubtedly grow up to respect her gender."

In 2001, Yo Mama's Last Supper sparked an enormous controversy when Rudy Giuliani, then mayor of New York City, saw the work and proceeded to accuse Cox of being anti-Catholic. Giuliani gained national attention when he subsequently called for the creation of a panel to create decency standards for all art shown in publicly funded museums in the city. Giuliani told the Daily News that he did "not believe that it is right for public money to be used to desecrate religion, to attack people's ethnicity."

Cox's Yo Mama is one of the focuses of writer Sheila F. Winborne's chapter, "Images of Jesus in Advancing Great Commission", in the book Teaching All Nations: Interrogating the Matthean Great Commission. Winborne describes Cox's Yo Mama as "fine", relating the piece to "The perpetuation of the myth that the realistically rendered white Christ is superior to all other representational approaches supports the perception that the main issue is about appearances as signs of cultural and spiritual value, whereas in reality the main concern is the power to control outcomes in one's own favor." Winborne further compares Cox's Yo Mama to popular representations of Christ by adding: "Ideas of white Christ as necessarily the most 'holy' of images reinforces the power of this myth's creators and supporters, along with the continued unequal treatment of others."

Cox publicly responded to Giuliani's accusations by defending her first amendment right to portray herself as Christ. As Cox explained, her Catholic school education taught her that all human beings were created in the likeness of God. "It's all very hypocritical," she was quoted as saying in the Daily News, "now that he has been busted with the other woman, I wouldn't be talking about moral issues." At the time, Giuliani had recently admitted his affair with long-time friend Judy Nathan and proceeded to divorce his wife, Donna Hanover.

Cox states that her reasoning for her Yo Mama's Last Supper piece was because "Christianity is big in the African-American community, but there are no presentations of us," Cox added, "I took it upon myself to include people of color in these classic scenarios."

This was the second time during Giuliani's tenure that he attempted to censor art shown in New York City's museums and it sparked a national controversy about artists' first amendment rights.

Exhibition history

Publication list

Books
Bonazzoli, Francesca; Robecchi, Michele. Mona Lisa to Marge: How the World's Greatest Artworks Entered Popular Culture.
Cassel, Valerie; Sabin, Roger; Weldt, Bernard; Mayo, Marti. Splat Boom Pow! The Influence of Cartoons in Contemporary Art.
Copeland, Cynthia R.; Hulser, Kathleen; Stokes Sims, Lowery, Legacies: Contemporary Artists Reflect on Slavery
Coq, Christian. Kreyol Factory
Cox, Renee; Isaak, Jo Anna. Renee Cox: American family. 
Cullen, Deborah; Fuentes, Elvis. Caribbean: Art at the Crossroads of the World.
Dunye, Cheryl; Goode Bryant, Linda; Tanner, Marcia; Tucker, Marcia. Bad Girls
Farrington, Lisa. Art & identity: the African-American aesthetic at the New School
Foner, Eric. Give Me Liberty!: An American History (Fourth Edition) (Vol. 1).
Heartney, Eleanor; Posner, Helaine; Princenthal, Nancy, Scott, Sue. The Reckoning: Women Artists of the New Millennium.
Hobson, Janell. Venus in the Dark: Blackness and Beauty in Popular Culture.
Hoffmann, Nancy. Who More Sci-Fi Than Us?: Contemporary Art from the Caribbean.
Isaac, Jo Anna. Looking Forward, Looking Black. 
Jay Z, Decoded
Jones, Amelia. Self/Image: Technology, Representation, and the Contemporary Subject
Lawrence, O'Neil. Pictures from Paradise: A Survey of Contemporary Caribbean Photography.
Liss, Andrea. Feminist Art and the Maternal.
Lotz, Leo. Bizarro World! The Parallel Universes of Comics & Fine Arts
Plate, S. Brent. Blasphemy: Art that Offends
Reid-Pharr, Robert F.; Delany, Samuel R. Black Gay Man: Essays.
Rosenfeld Dassel, Sara. Dramatis personae: a look at role-playing and narrative in contemporary photography.
Solana, Guillermo. Heroinas 
Stirratt, Betsy; Johnson, Catherine. Feminine Persuasion: Art and Essays on Sexuality. 
Szeemann, Harald. Venice Biennale 1999: Over All - 48th Exposition of International Art, Aperto.
Thompson, Barbara. Black Womanhood: Images, Icons, and Ideologies of the African Body.
Willis, Deborah. Black Venus 2010: They Called Her "Hottentot".
Willis, Deborah; Williams, Carla. The Black Female Body: A Photographic History
X Ball, Barry; Steensma, Regnerus; Nieboer, Jan Willem; Blaettler, James R. The one chosen: images of Christ in recent New York art
Yee, Lydia. Urban Mythologies: The Bronx Represented Since 1960's

Magazines and journals
Charles, Nick. "Art of fighting stereotypes." Daily News 
Colangelo, Lisa and Michael R. Blood "Rufy & 'Yo Mama,'" Daily News
Eversley, Shelly; Morgan, Jennifer. The Sexual Body: WSQ: Spring / Summer 2007.
Nochlin, Linda. "Learning From 'Black Male'" Art in America, March 1995 
Srivastav, Vinita. "The Woman Behind the Storm." Savoy Magazine, May 2001
Smith, Roberta. "Body of Evidence." Vogue, August 1994
The Sunday Review 10 July 2000. "Pride and Prejudice", The Independent on Sunday.

References

External links 
 Renee Cox's Official Website
 Salon interview with Cox
 Rush Art Gallery
 Soul Culture
 Aperture interview with Cox

1960 births
American women photographers
American photographers
American contemporary artists
Feminist artists
Jamaican emigrants to the United States
Living people
People from Queens, New York
Syracuse University College of Visual and Performing Arts alumni
Postmodern artists
People from Scarsdale, New York
Jamaican photographers
Jamaican women photographers
Jamaican artists
21st-century American women
American women curators
American curators